Swannanoa is an Italian Renaissance Revival villa built in 1912 by millionaire and philanthropist James H. Dooley (1841–1922) above Rockfish Gap on the border of northern Nelson County and Augusta County, Virginia, in the US. It is partially based on buildings in the Villa Medici, Rome.

Rockfish Gap is the southern end of the Skyline Drive through the Shenandoah National Park and the northern terminus of the Blue Ridge Parkway.

It is located on the crest of the Blue Ridge mountains, overlooking both Shenandoah and Rockfish valleys.  It is located on a jurisdictional border, so it is in both Augusta and Nelson counties.

History
Intended to be a "summer place" for Richmond, Virginia millionaire and philanthropist James H. Dooley and his wife Sarah "Sallie" O. May, it reportedly took over 300 artisans several years to build the structure, complete with marble from Tate, GA and inside Italian Marbleb Georgian marble, Tiffany windows, and terraced gardens. It was built as a token of love from husband to wife, the depth of James and Sallie May's relationship being represented in the 4,000 piece Tiffany stained-glass window and a domed ceiling bearing the likeness of Mrs. Dooley  Despite the lavish expenditure, it was occupied only for a few years following completion in 1912.

Major Dooley died in 1922 at the age of 82. He left Swannanoa entirely to his wife, Sallie Mae, along with several million dollars. Sallie May Dooley died in 1925 at the age of 79. Major Dooley left the estate to his four sisters. Many pieces of the Swannanoa furniture were moved to Maymont upon the death of Sallie May. Her Swan furniture and bed are on display at Maymont in Richmond, Virginia.

When the property was built it had state-of-the-art fixtures for the time. Electricity, plumbing and central heat were installed in the house. It was the first house to have electricity in Nelson County and to accomplish this it had its own power plant on the property. There also was a built-in elevator. Like Monticello, Thomas Jefferson's house 27 miles away, it had a dumbwaiter to bring food up from the basement kitchen to the butler's pantry on the first floor and placed on a radiator with flat shelving.

The sisters sold Swannanoa in 1926 to the Valley Corporation of Richmond, which became the second owner of Swannanoa. They planned and opened the Swannanoa Country Club and Golf Course in 1927. With the 1929 Depression, the country club had no revenue and Dooley sisters took back the property in 1932. During the Country Club era, they built a small stone building on the property for guests to pay their golf fees and it was rumored to house the region's best moonshine distillery and to be a favored supplier for government officials during Prohibition. The golf course was an 18-hole course. It was during Swannanoa's time as a country club that Calvin Coolidge had Thanksgiving dinner (1928) at the mansion. The sumptuous accommodations and isolation from the Capitol's hubbub seemed to affect Mrs. Coolidge deeply, giving her "the giddiness of a mare in the spring" according to the waitstaff. Calvin was typically silent on the subject, but seemed rather drawn and sleepy for the next day's hunting.

The United States Navy considered purchasing and renovating the property in 1942, which they calculated would cost $200,000, for the purpose of establishing a secret facility to interrogate prisoners of war. The military rejected it in favor of a Civilian Conservation Corps camp in Fort Hunt, Virginia, because it seemed unlikely that Congress would approve the purchase of such a palatial structure for the purpose.

The mansion stood empty through the Great Depression and World War II until A.T. Dulaney purchased it with a group of Charlottesville business men and formed Skyline Swannanoa, Inc. In 1944. Swannanoa was leased in 1948 to Walter Russell for his University of Science and Philosophy.

Gallery

Notable visitors
President Calvin Coolidge and his wife visited nearby Swannanoa Country Club on Thanksgiving Day 1928. Whether or not the Coolidges actually visited Swannanoa mansion is unknown, however Sandi Dulaney, wife of the current owner of Skyline Swannanoa has photographs showing the Coolidges and their entourage coming off the Afton Train Station, in front of Swannanoa and the president shooting in the garden.  But from another source, the Swannanoa Country Club was this mansion building, and he did visit the building.

See also
 Hotel Colorado:  Another structure inspired by the Villa Medici.

References

External links
Swannanoa's official page: Swannanoa’s webpage
Sizemore, Donna. "Swannanoa: An Afton Mountain Palace". Curio, Summer 1980. James Madison University: Harrisonburg, VA. 15–19.

Houses in Nelson County, Virginia
Italianate architecture in Virginia
Renaissance Revival architecture in Virginia
Houses completed in 1912
Houses on the National Register of Historic Places in Virginia
National Register of Historic Places in Augusta County, Virginia
National Register of Historic Places in Nelson County, Virginia
Villas in the United States
1912 establishments in Virginia
Gilded Age mansions